Lake Wickenden (French: Lac Wickenden) is the largest lake on Anticosti Island, located in the municipality of L'Île-d'Anticosti, in the Saint Lawrence River, in the Minganie Regional County Municipality, in the region administration of the Côte-Nord, in the province of Quebec, Canada.

Together with the surrounding , this lake was designated as a protected area on January 1, 1993 by the WCPA. This area is designated "Rare Forest of Lac-Wickenden".

Forestry is the main economic activity in this area; recreational tourism activities, second.

Geography 
Glacially formed, lake Wickenden is part of Jupiter River watershed. Several surrounding lakes are surrounded by small areas of marsh.

A strip of land separates Lac de la Tête and Lake Wickenden.

The hamlet Wickenden is located at the end of a bay on the western shore of the lake. An access road (coming from the west) serves this hamlet and the south shore of the lake.

Toponymy 

Maps from the late 1930s indicate "Wickenden Lake". The lake was named after Henri Robert Wickenden who worked on Anticosti Island for the Wayagamack Paper Corporation in the 1920s. Wickenden also served as a forestry director for the Wayagamack Pulp and Paper Company. In 1926, his team assessed the economic potential of the Anticostian forests; the Wickenden team drew positive conclusions recommending this proposed acquisition. Wickenden then represented the Anticosti Corporation; this company then included the Wayagamack, the St. Mauritius Valley Corporation and the Port Alfred Pulp and Paper Company. On July 29, 1926, this company acquired the island; the seller being the French senator Gaston Menier.

The toponym "lac Wickenden" was made official on December 5, 1968 at the Commission de toponymie du Québec place name bank.

References

External links

Lakes of Côte-Nord
Anticosti Island
Minganie Regional County Municipality